CTBC may refer to:

Companhia de Telecomunicações do Brasil Central, former name of Algar Telecom
CTBC Financial Holding, Taiwanese holding company
CTBC Bank, Taiwanese bank, subsidiary of CTBC Holding
CTBC Brothers, Taiwanese professional baseball team